The binasuan is a Filipino folk dance in which the performer holds full wine glasses in each hand while performing balancing tricks. Wine may be used to fill the glasses, but other liquids may be substituted. The arms are rotated over and under the shoulder in order to keep the palms facing up so as not to spill the liquid while nevertheless allowing the radius to cross over the ulna via pronation. Binasuan originated in Pangasinan and is popular at festive events such as weddings.

Since the binasuan inverts the arm through rotation, it is sometimes given as a macroscopic, physical demonstration of the rotation properties of a spin-½ spinor. As the liquid never spills, the rotation can all occur within the same plane. Upon a rotation of 2π radians, the elbow changes between pointing up and down.  Upon a rotation of 4π radians, the palm "doubly covers" the shoulder, and the elbow points in its original direction.

Dances of the Philippines
Culture of Pangasinan